St. Mary's Co-Ed School, Harda, Madhya Pradesh, India, 
was established in 1986 by the Roman Catholic Church of India. The school follows the C.B.S.E system of education. St. Mary's is spread over a comfortably sized campus near Harda railway station. The school educates boys and girls of all castes and religions.

Academics 
St. Mary's is affiliated with the Central Board of Secondary Education (CBSE) and functions up to the higher secondary level of education (class 12).

Co-Curricular activities 
The school houses a basketball ground and students are primarily engaged in Cricket and Basketball games. With students divided in Blue, Green, Yellow and Red groups sports and athletic competitions are held every year in a number of sports.

There is an annual event where students perform and set up stalls across the school campus for entertainment and other activities. The event draws a fair crowd from the town.

Management (2019) 

 Principal: Fr. Leo Babu
 Manager: Fr. V.M. Davidson  

Official Website

Catholic boarding schools in India
Boarding schools in Madhya Pradesh
High schools and secondary schools in Madhya Pradesh
Christian schools in Madhya Pradesh
Harda
Educational institutions established in 1986
1986 establishments in Madhya Pradesh